Lance Ronnie Kendricks (born January 30, 1988) is a former American football tight end. He played college football at Wisconsin, where he was recognized as a consensus All-American. He was drafted by the St. Louis Rams in the second round of the 2011 NFL Draft.

Early years
Kendricks was born in Milwaukee, Wisconsin. He attended Rufus King International Baccalaureate High School in Milwaukee, where he played for the Rufus King Generals football and basketball teams. In football, he was a two-time all-city selection, the Generals' most valuable player (MVP) as a junior and senior, and the team captain as a senior. He caught 42 passes for 640 yards as a senior, and totaled 102 receptions for 1,905 yards during his high school career. He was also a member of the Generals track and field team, where he was one of the state's top performers in the jumping events. He was a four-time AAU triple jump champion. At the WIAA Division 1 State Championship, he finished third in the triple jump as a sophomore and second as a junior.

College career
Kendricks attended the University of Wisconsin–Madison, where he played on the Wisconsin Badgers football team from 2007 to 2010. As a senior in 2010, he was a finalist for the John Mackey Award, received first-team All-Big Ten honors, and was recognized as a consensus first-team All-American.

Kendricks also competed for the Badgers track team in 2007. At the Big Ten Indoor Championships, he placed 12th in the triple jump. He also participated in the long jump event at the Big Ten Conference, where he took 21st.

College statistics

Professional career

St. Louis / Los Angeles Rams
The St. Louis Rams selected Kendricks in the second round (47th overall) of the 2011 NFL Draft.

On June 29, 2011, he signed a contract with the Rams. He made his NFL debut on September 11, 2011, catching one pass for 18 yards against the Philadelphia Eagles. On October 4, 2012, he recorded his first career touchdown on a 7-yard pass from Sam Bradford against the Arizona Cardinals. On March 11, 2015, the Rams signed Kendricks to a four-year, $18.5 million contract extension that included $10 million guaranteed. However, he was released by the Rams on March 10, 2017.

Green Bay Packers

On March 11, 2017, the Green Bay Packers signed Kendricks to a two-year, $4 million contract that included a $1.2 million signing bonus. On September 10, 2017, in his Packers debut, he had 2 receptions for 18 yards against the Seattle Seahawks.  On September 24, 2017, Kendricks caught his first touchdown with the Packers on a 1 yard pass from quarterback Aaron Rodgers in a 27–24 win over the Cincinnati Bengals.  On October 7, 2018, he caught his first touchdown of the 2018 season from Rodgers in a 31–23 loss to the Detroit Lions.

New England Patriots
On July 24, 2019, Kendricks was signed by the New England Patriots. He was suspended the first game of the season for violating the league's policy on substances of abuse. He was released from the Patriots on September 9, 2019.

Los Angeles Chargers
On September 17, 2019, Kendricks was signed by the Los Angeles Chargers.

NFL career statistics

Regular season

Personal life
Kendricks was stopped for a speeding violation in the early morning hours of September 2, 2017, while heading back to Green Bay from a Wisconsin Badgers football game. He was let go with a warning, but a citation for marijuana possession was issued in December 2017 as a result of a search during the traffic stop. The citation was dismissed in October 2018 but later that month, Kendricks was charged with misdemeanor marijuana possession. In January 2019, an attorney for Kendricks entered a not guilty plea on his behalf. Kendricks later pled no contest and was sentenced to six months probation, with the charge to be dropped if eight hours of community service was completed.

References

External links
Los Angeles Chargers bio
Green Bay Packers bio
Los Angeles Rams bio
Wisconsin Badgers bio

1988 births
Living people
Players of American football from Milwaukee
American football wide receivers
American football tight ends
Wisconsin Badgers football players
All-American college football players
St. Louis Rams players
Los Angeles Rams players
Green Bay Packers players
New England Patriots players
Los Angeles Chargers players
Rufus King International High School alumni
Ed Block Courage Award recipients